Gennadi "Genna" Sosonko (Gennady Borisovich Sosonko; born 18 May 1943) is a Soviet-born Dutch chess player and writer. He has been awarded the title Grandmaster (GM) by FIDE and is a twice Dutch champion.

Career
Born in Troitsk, Russia, Sosonko won the Leningrad juniors' championship in 1958. 

He legally emigrated from the Soviet Union to the Netherlands via Israel in 1972.

Sosonko won the Dutch Championship in 1973 and 1978 (jointly).
His tournament record includes 1st at Wijk aan Zee 1977, 1st at Nijmegen 1978, 3rd at Amsterdam 1980, 1st at Wijk aan Zee 1981, 3rd at Tilburg 1982 and 4th at Haninge 1988.  He also drew a match with Jan Timman (+1 =0 −1) in 1984.

Sosonko played for the Dutch team at the Chess Olympiad eleven times, in 1974-84, and 1988-96. He won two individual medals: gold at Haifa 1976, bronze at Nice 1974, and two team medals: silver at Haifa 1976, and bronze at Thessaloniki 1988.

FIDE, the World Chess Federation, awarded Sosonko the International Master (IM) title in 1974, the GM title in 1976 and the FIDE Senior Trainer title in 2004.

Books

Sosonko has authored six non-technical chess books centering heavily on his chess life in the Soviet Union and his relationships with and memories of both leading Soviet players and lesser-known characters in chess history.

References

Further reading

External links

 
 
 

1943 births
Living people
Soviet chess players
Dutch chess players
Dutch chess writers
Chess grandmasters
Chess Olympiad competitors
Chess coaches
Jewish chess players
Jewish Dutch sportspeople
Russian Jews
Soviet emigrants to the Netherlands
People from Troitsk, Chelyabinsk Oblast